A Trip to the Moon is a 1902 French silent film by Georges Méliès.

A Trip to the Moon or Le voyage dans la lune may also refer to:

 Trip to the Moon (1958 film), a Mexican comedy film
 "A Trip to the Moon" (Chronicle), a 1964 TV science fiction comedy film episode
 Le voyage dans la lune (album), by Air, 2012
 Le voyage dans la lune (opera-féerie), by Jacques Offenbach, 1875
 A Trip to the Moon (attraction), a dark ride at Coney Island
 Drop the Dip, later known as Trip to the Moon, a former roller coaster at Coney Island

See also
 Exploration of the Moon, various missions to the Moon
 Moonshot (disambiguation)
 Comical History of the States and Empires of the Moon, a satirical novel by Cyrano de Bergerac, published	1657